Maya is a 1999 trilingual devotional film, produced and directed by Rama Narayanan. The film featured Napolean alongside Nagma, while S. P. Balasubrahmanyam plays a supporting role. The venture was simultaneously shot in Tamil, Telugu and Kannada, with the other versions being titled as Gurupoornima and Jayasurya respectively, with scenes overlapping. The Tamil version was dubbed in Hindi as Sai Tere Maya. The films, which had music composed by R. R. G, opened in January, 1999.

Cast
Napolean as Prathap (Suriya in Kannada)
Nagma as Lakshmi
S. P. Balasubrahmanyam as Bomma Rangan
Vadivelu
Tennis Krishna
T. P. Gajendran
Rami Reddy as Bangaar Rao
Vadivukkarasi as Anitha
Girish Karnad
Sheela as Jayasurya

Soundtrack
The soundtrack was composed by R. R. G.

Release
The Tamil and Kannada versions were released in 1999, with the Telugu version released shortly thereafter.

References

External links

1999 films
1990s Tamil-language films
Indian multilingual films
Indian fantasy films
Films directed by Rama Narayanan
Hindu devotional films
1990s Telugu-language films
1990s Kannada-language films
1999 fantasy films
1999 multilingual films